Joseph Earl Marshall, Jr. (born 1947) is an American author, lecturer, radio talk show host, and community activist.

Marshall grew up in St. Louis, Missouri and the South Central part of Los Angeles, California.  He graduated from Loyola High School of Los Angeles, the University of San Francisco with a BA in political science and sociology (1968), San Francisco State University in 1974 with an M.A. in Education, and the Wright Institute with a Ph.D. in Psychology. Marshall became a teacher at Woodrow Wilson High School of San Francisco in 1969 after getting his B.A. In 1994, Marshall left his teaching job to become an anti-violence activist.

San Francisco urban contemporary station KMEL hired Marshall to host the Sunday night talk show Street Soldiers after local rapper MC Hammer hosted the November 1991 debut show. The show continues to air every Sunday night from 8-10pm PST and focuses on discussing critical issues and events affecting the African American community and its youth.

He is the founder of 501c(3) non-profit organization Alive & Free, the mission of which is to keep young people alive and free, unharmed by violence and free from incarceration. Alive & Free operates under the principles of treating violence like a disease. Like any disease, there are specific risk factors, symptoms, and a prescription for healing or prevention. Marshall also founded the Street Soldiers National Consortium, a group of activists dedicated to preventing violence nationwide.

Awards
 2004 Ashoka Fellow
 1994 MacArthur Fellows Program
 Leadership Award from the Children's Defense Fund
 Essence Award honoring outstanding contributions by African American men
 1996 Martin Luther King, Jr. Memorial Award from the National Educational Association
 2001 "Use Your Life Award" from Oprah Winfrey's Angel Network.
 2012 "Best Community-Oriented Radio Program Award" from SF Weekly for Street Soldiers

Works
 Street Soldier, One Man's Struggle to Save a Generation, One Life at a Time, Delacorte Press, 1996,

References

1947 births
Living people
Schoolteachers from California
San Francisco State University alumni
Wright Institute alumni
MacArthur Fellows
African-American radio personalities
Writers from Los Angeles
Writers from St. Louis
Radio personalities from San Francisco
University of San Francisco alumni
Activists from California
21st-century African-American people
20th-century African-American people
Ashoka Fellows